Camilo Torres may refer to:

Camilo Torres Restrepo, liberation theologian, priest and guerrilla member in Colombia during the 1960s
Camilo Torres Tenorio, political leader of Colombia's independence struggle against Spain  in the 1810s